The 1975 Denver Broncos season was the team's 16th year in professional football and its sixth with the National Football League (NFL). Led by fourth-year head coach and general manager John Ralston, the Broncos were 6–8, second in the AFC West, but five games behind the Oakland Raiders, who clinched in late November.

Denver opened the season with two wins at home, against the Chiefs and Packers, but won only four of their last twelve games. In their sixteen years of existence, the Broncos had yet to reach the postseason.

Offseason

NFL Draft

Personnel

Staff

Roster

Regular season

Schedule

Game summaries

Week 2

Standings

References

External links
Denver Broncos – 1975 media guide
1975 Denver Broncos at Pro-Football-Reference.com

Denver Broncos
Denver Broncos seasons
Denver Broncos season